The 2019 NCAA Division I men's ice hockey tournament was the national championship tournament for men's college ice hockey in the United States. The tournament involved 16 teams in single-elimination play to determine the national champion at the Division I level of the National Collegiate Athletic Association (NCAA), the highest level of competition in college hockey. The tournament's Frozen Four – the semifinals and finals – were hosted by the MAAC at the KeyBank Center in Buffalo, New York from April 11–13, 2019. This was the second Frozen Four in the city of Buffalo, as it previously hosted in 2003.

This was the first championship since 2007 to have multiple programs make their first NCAA tournament appearance (American International and Arizona State).

Bowling Green State University made their first appearance in the NCAA tournament in 29 years, while for the first time since 1992 an Independent program (Arizona State) made the tournament.

The tournament is as remembered for the lack of attendance as anything that happened on the ice. All semifinal and championship games had at least 5,000 fewer spectators than the building capacity (19,070) and the title game saw the lowest attendance since 2000. Though there was much discussion on the matter, a general consensus by fan bases was that the ticket prices of $200–$300 were far too high even for a championship game.

Tournament procedure

The tournament is composed of four groups of four teams in regional brackets.  The four regionals are officially named after their geographic areas.  The following are the sites for the 2019 regionals:

March 29–30 
Northeast Regional, SNHU Arena – Manchester, New Hampshire (Host: New Hampshire)
West Regional, Scheels Arena – Fargo, North Dakota (Host: North Dakota)
March 30–31
East Regional, Dunkin' Donuts Center – Providence, Rhode Island (Host: Brown)
Midwest Regional, PPL Center – Allentown, Pennsylvania (Host: Penn State)

The winner of each regional will advance to the Frozen Four:
April 11/13
KeyBank Center – Buffalo, New York (Host: MAAC)

Qualifying teams
The at-large bids and seeding for each team in the tournament were announced on March 24. Teams were seeded according to their PairWise rankings (PWR) 1 thru 16 then matchups were adjusted to prevent teams from the same conference meeting in the first round. After the four groups were decided they were placed in regions as close, geographically, to the top seed as possible. The ECAC Hockey had four teams receive a berth in the tournament, the NCHC and Hockey East each had three teams receive a berth, the WCHA and Big Ten had two teams receive a berth, while one team from Atlantic Hockey received a berth. For the first time since 1992 an independent program, Arizona State, also received a tournament berth.

Number in parentheses denotes overall seed in the tournament.

Tournament bracket 

Note: * denotes overtime period

Results

West Region – Fargo, North Dakota

Regional semifinal

Regional Final

Midwest Region – Allentown, Pennsylvania

Regional semifinal

Regional Final

East Region – Providence, Rhode Island

Regional semifinal

Regional Final

Northeast Region – Manchester, New Hampshire

Regional semifinal

Regional Final

Frozen Four – KeyBank Center, Buffalo, New York

National semifinal

2019 National Championship

(MW1) Minnesota–Duluth vs. (NE1) Massachusetts

All-Tournament team
G: Hunter Shepard (Minnesota–Duluth)
D: Mikey Anderson (Minnesota–Duluth)
D: Marc Del Gaizo (Massachusetts)
F: Parker Mackay* (Minnesota–Duluth)
F: Justin Richards (Minnesota–Duluth)
F: Billy Exell (Minnesota–Duluth)
* Most Outstanding Player(s)

Record by conference

Media

Television
ESPN had US television rights to all games during the tournament for the fifteenth consecutive year. ESPN aired every game, beginning with the regionals, on ESPN, ESPN2, ESPNews, ESPNU, and ESPN3, which were streamed online via WatchESPN.

In Canada, the tournament was broadcast by TSN and streamed on TSN Go.

In the UK, the tournament was broadcast by BT Sport ESPN.

Broadcast assignments
Regionals
Northeast Regional: John Buccigross, Barry Melrose, Colby Cohen and Quint Kessenich – Manchester, New Hampshire
West Regional: Clay Matvick and Dave Starman – Fargo, North Dakota
East Regional: Leah Hextall and Billy Jaffe – Providence, Rhode Island
Midwest Regional: Kevin Brown and Fred Pletsch – Allentown, Pennsylvania

Frozen Four
John Buccigross, Barry Melrose, Colby Cohen and Quint Kessenich – Buffalo, New York

Radio
Westwood One had exclusive radio rights to the Frozen Four and broadcast both the semifinals and the championship.
Brian Tripp, Pat Micheletti, & Shireen Saski

References

Tournament
NCAA Division I men's ice hockey tournament
NCAA Division I men's ice hockey tournament
NCAA Division I men's ice hockey tournament
NCAA Division I men's ice hockey tournament
NCAA Division I men's ice hockey tournament
NCAA Division I men's ice hockey tournament
NCAA Division I men's ice hockey tournament
NCAA Division I men's ice hockey tournament
21st century in Buffalo, New York
History of Allentown, Pennsylvania
History of Providence, Rhode Island
Ice hockey competitions in New York (state)
Ice hockey competitions in Pennsylvania
Ice hockey competitions in Rhode Island
Sports competitions in Buffalo, New York
Ice hockey competitions in New Hampshire
Ice hockey competitions in North Dakota
Sports in Allentown, Pennsylvania
Sports in Fargo, North Dakota
Sports in Manchester, New Hampshire
Sports in Providence, Rhode Island